Chandler, and its variant spellings, is a family name that originated as an occupational surname in medieval England. It applied to a person involved in making or selling candles and similar articles. The earliest records as a surname are of Matthew le Candeler in London in 1274 and William le Chandeler in Essex in 1275. In the 1881 census of England, the surname Chandler was apparently used by over 0.3% of the population.

As of 2010, Chandler ranked as the 404th most popular surname in the United States, with 79,186 citizens.

Notable people with the surname "Chandler" include

A
Aaron Chandler (born 1983), American soccer player
A. Bertram Chandler (1912–1984), Australian marine officer
Abiel Chandler (1777–1851), American philanthropist
Al Chandler (born 1950), American football player
Albert Chandler (disambiguation), multiple people
A. Lee Chandler (1922–2012), American judge
Alfred Chandler (disambiguation), multiple people
Allan Chandler (1907–1970), Australian rules footballer
Allen Chandler (1849–1926), British cricketer
Alvin Duke Chandler (1902–1987), American academic administrator
Andrea Chandler, American farmer and sailor
Andrew Chandler (disambiguation), multiple people
Anna Chandler (1884–1957), American actress and singer 
Annie Chandler (swimmer) (born 1987), American swimmer
Arthur Chandler (disambiguation), multiple people
Ash Chandler, Indian actor

B
Ben Chandler (born 1959), American politician
Bert Chandler (disambiguation), multiple people
Bill Chandler (1895–1953), American basketball coach
Bill Chandler (ice hockey) (1930–1991), Canadian ice hockey player
Bob Chandler (1949–1995), American football player
Bob Chandler (footballer) (1894–1964), English footballer
Brett Chandler (born 1975), Australian rules footballer
Bruce Chandler (born 1952), American politician
Brynne Chandler (born 1958), American screenwriter
Bubba Chandler (born 2002), American baseball player
Bud Chandler (1905–1996), American tennis player

C
Caroline Augusta Chandler (1906–1979), American doctor and author
Carrol Chandler (born 1952), American general
Catherine Chandler (born 1950), Canadian poet and translator
Cecil Chandler (1902–1958), British rower
Charles Chandler (disambiguation), multiple people
Charlotte Chandler, American biographer and playwright
Chas Chandler (1938–1996), English musician
Chick Chandler (1905–1988), American actor
Christine Chandler (born 1958), American politician
Christopher Chandler (disambiguation), multiple people
Claire Chandler (born 1990), Australian politician
Colby Chandler (CEO) (1925/1926–2021), American businessman
Craig Chandler (born 1970), Canadian businessman

D
Dan Chandler (born 1978), American singer
Dana Chandler (born 1941), American artist and activist
Daniel Chandler (born 1952), British visual semiotician
Daniel Chandler (wrestler) (born 1951), American wrestler
Danny Chandler (1959–2010), American motocross racer
David Chandler (disambiguation), multiple people
Dean Chandler (born 1976), English footballer
Dianne Chandler (born 1946), American model
Dick Chandler (1910–1969), Australian rules footballer
Dillard Chandler (1907–1992), American singer
Don Chandler (1934–2011), American football player
Donald S. Chandler, American entomologist 
Dorothy Buffum Chandler (1901–1997), American cultural leader
Doug Chandler (born 1965), American motorcycle racer
Douglas Chandler (1889–??), American broadcaster

E
Ed Chandler (1917–2003), American baseball player
Eddy Chandler (1894–1948), American actor
Edgar Chandler (1946–1992), American football player
Edgar Chandler (minister) (1904–1988), American minister
Edmund Leavens Chandler (1829–1880), Canadian merchant and politician
Edward Chandler (disambiguation), multiple people
Eileen Chandler (1904–1993), British painter
Elias Chandler (1856–1909), American colonel
Elisabeth Gordon Chandler (1913–2006), American sculptor
Elizabeth Margaret Chandler (1807–1834), American poet and writer
Ella Chandler (born 2000), English cricketer
Emilie Chandler (born 1983), French politician
Ernest Chandler (1891–1936), British boxer

F
Francis Chandler (1849–1937), British trade unionist
Fred Chandler (1912–2005), English footballer

G
Gene Chandler (born 1937), American singer-songwriter
Gene G. Chandler (born 1947), American politician
George Chandler (disambiguation), multiple people
Gilbert Chandler (1903–1974), Australian  politician
Glenn Chandler (born 1949), Scottish playwright and novelist
Gordon Chandler (born 1953), American sculptor
Gordon Chandler (cricketer) (1909–2003), English cricketer
Grace Chandler (1879–1967), American photographer

H
Happy Chandler (1898–1991), American politician
Harriette L. Chandler (born 1937), American politician
Harry Chandler (1864–1944), American publisher
Harvey Chandler (born 1995), English snooker player
Helen Chandler (1906–1965), American actress
Henry Chandler (disambiguation), multiple people

I
Ian Chandler (disambiguation), multiple people

J
Jabarry Chandler (born 1994), Barbadian footballer
J. A. C. Chandler (1872–1934), American historian and academic administrator
Jamal Chandler (born 1989), Barbadian footballer
James Chandler (disambiguation), multiple people
Jamie Chandler (born 1989), English footballer
Jamie P. Chandler (born 1977), American political scientist
Janet Chandler (1911–1994), American model and actress
Jason Chandler (born 1969), American vocalist
Jeff Chandler (disambiguation), multiple people
Jennifer Chandler (born 1959), American diver
Jessie Chandler (born 1968), American author
Jim Chandler (1941–2017), American poet
Jo Chandler (born 1965), Australian journalist
Joan Chandler (1923–1979), American actress
Johanna Chandler (1820–1875), British philanthropist
John Chandler (disambiguation), multiple people
Joseph Chandler (disambiguation), multiple people
Joyce Chandler (born 1939), American politician
J. Wyeth Chandler (1930–2004), American politician

K
Kade Chandler (born 2000), Australian rules footballer
Karen Chandler (1923–2010), American singer
Karl Chandler (born 1952), American football player
Karl Chandler (comedian) (born 1941), Australian writer and comedian
Katherine Agnes Chandler (1865–1930), American botanist and author
Kathleen Chandler (born 1932), American politician
Kennedy Chandler (born 2002), American basketball player
Kerri Chandler (born 1969), American record producer
Kevin M. Chandler (born 1960), American politician and lawyer
Knox Chandler, American musician
Kyle Chandler (born 1965), American actor

L
Lane Chandler (1899–1972), American actor
Lauryn Chandler, American author
Lawrence Chandler, British-American composer
Len Chandler (born 1935), American musician
Leonard B. Chandler (1851–1927), American businessman and politician
Leslie Gordon Chandler (1888–1980), Australian ornithologist
Lloyd Chandler (1896–1978), American musician
Lorraine Chandler (1946–2020), American singer-songwriter
Lucinda Banister Chandler (1828–1911), American social reformer

M
Marc Chandler (born 1961), American foreign exchange market analyst
Margaret Bailey Chandler (1929–1997), American community leader
Marian Otis Chandler (1866–1952), American businesswoman
Marjorie Elizabeth Jane Chandler (1897–1983), British paleobotanist
Marquin Chandler (born 1982), American basketball player
Martin Spencer Chandler (1828–1893), American farmer and politician
Mary Chandler (1687–1745), English poet
Matthew Chandler (disambiguation), multiple people
Michael Chandler (disambiguation), multiple people
Michelle Chandler (born 1974), Australian basketball player
Mike Chandler (born 1958), American stock car racing driver
Murray Chandler (born 1960), New Zealand chess grandmaster

N
Nate Chandler (born 1989), American football player
Neil Chandler (1949–2022), Australian rules footballer 
Nev Chandler (1946–1994), American broadcaster
Newton Chandler (1893–1997), Australian rules footballer 
Norman Chandler (1899–1973), American publisher

O
Oba Chandler (1946–2011), American convicted murderer
Oliver P. Chandler (1807–1895), American attorney and politician
Otis Chandler (1927–2006), American published

P
Paul-Gordon Chandler (born 1964), American author
Peleg Chandler (1816–1889), American lawyer and politician
Peter Chandler (disambiguation), multiple people
Phil Chandler (born 1972), New Zealand cricketer
Polly Chandler, American photographer

R
Ralph Chandler (1829–1889), American admiral
Ray Chandler (1944–2010), American softball coach
Raymond Chandler (1888–1959), American author
Raymond F. Chandler (born 1962), American army officer
Rex Chandler (1937–2014), American politician
Richard Chandler (disambiguation), multiple people
Robert Chandler (disambiguation), multiple people
Rod Chandler (born 1942), American politician
Roger Chandler, American wrestling coach
Roger Chandler (politician), English politician
Ron Chandler, British motorcycle racer
Roy F. Chandler (1925–2015), American author

S
Samuel Chandler (1693–1766), British minister
Samuel Chandler (politician) (1760–1851), American-Canadian merchant
Scott Chandler (American football) (born 1985), American football player
Sean Chandler (born 1996), American football player
Seth Carlo Chandler (1846–1913), American astronomer
Sid Chandler (1901–1961), English footballer
Silas Chandler (1838–1919), American slave
Simon Chandler (born 1953), British actor
Spud Chandler (1907–1990), American baseball player
Stephanie Chandler, American entrepreneur
Stephen Chandler (disambiguation), multiple people
Sue Chandler, British schoolteacher

T
Tanis Chandler (1924–2006), French-American actress
Theophilus P. Chandler Jr. (1845–1928), American architect
Tertius Chandler (1915–2000), American historian and author
Theodore E. Chandler (1894–1945), American admiral
Thomas Chandler (disambiguation), multiple people
Thornton Chandler (born 1963), American football player
Tim Chandler (1960–2018), American musician
Timothy Chandler (born 1990), German-American soccer player
Tina Chandler (born 1974), American bodybuilder
Tyson Chandler (born 1982), American basketball player
Ty Chandler (American football) (born 1998), American football player

V
Vedra Chandler (born 1980), American singer and dancer
Vicki Chandler, American plant geneticist
Victor Chandler (born 1951), British businessman
Vivienne Chandler (1947–2013), English-French actress and photographer

W
Walter Chandler (disambiguation), multiple people
Wes Chandler (born 1956), American football player
Willard H. Chandler (1830–1901), American politician
William Chandler (disambiguation), multiple people
Wilson Chandler (born 1987), American basketball player 
Winthrop Chandler (1747–1790), American artist

Z
Zachariah Chandler (1813–1879), American businessman and politician

Fictional characters
Adam Chandler, a character on the television series All My Children
AJ Chandler, a character on the television series All My Children
Colby Chandler (All My Children), a character on the television series All My Children
JR Chandler, a character on the television series All My Children
Krystal Carey Chandler, a character on the television series All My Children
Liz Chandler, a character on the soap opera Days of Our Lives
Marlo Chandler, a character in the comic book series Marvel Comics
Scott Chandler (All My Children), a character on the television series All My Children
Skye Chandler, a character on the television series' All My Children, One Life to Live, and General Hospital
Stuart Chandler, a character on the television All My Children
Tom Chandler (The Last Ship), a character on the television series The Last Ship

See also
Chandler (given name), a page for people with the given name "Chandler"
Admiral Chandler (disambiguation), a disambiguation page for Admirals surnamed "Chandler"
Justice Chandler (disambiguation), a disambiguation page for Justices surnamed "Chandler"
Senator Chandler (disambiguation), a disambiguation page for Senators surnamed "Chandler"
Chandler (disambiguation), a disambiguation page for "Chandler"

References 

English-language surnames
Occupational surnames
English-language occupational surnames